Komsomolsk-on-Amur railway station is a railway station in Komsomolsk-on-Amur, Russia.

Trains follow from the station in four directions:
In the direction of Khabarovsk - freight and passenger traffic.
In the direction of Tynda (BAM) - freight and passenger traffic.
In the direction of Sovetskaya Gavan - freight and passenger traffic.
In the direction of Dzemgi station - only freight traffic.

At this station, the locomotives of freight and passenger trains are switched over. Parking transit trains is about 1 hour.

References

Railway stations in Khabarovsk Krai